Mário Alberto Perini (born in 1943) is a Brazilian linguist known mainly for his work on the description of Brazilian Portuguese. He is professor emeritus at the Federal University of Minas Gerais; he has also taught at the University of Illinois and at the University of Mississippi. In 2021, Perini was elected Honorary Member of the Brazilian Linguistics Association.

Selected works 

 Gramática do Infinitivo Português (1977)
 Para uma nova gramática do português (1985)
 Sintaxe portuguesa: metodologia e funções (1989)
 Gramática descritiva do português (1995)
 Sofrendo a gramática: ensaios sobre a linguagem (1997)
 Modern Portuguese: A reference grammar (2002)
 A língua do Brasil amanhã e outros mistérios (2004)
 Princípios de linguística descritiva: introdução ao pensamento gramatical (2006)
 Estudos de gramática descritiva: as valências verbais (2008)
 Gramática do português brasileiro (2010)
 Describing verb valency: practical and theoretical issues (2015)
 Gramática descritiva do português brasileiro (2016)
 Thematic Relations: A Study in the Grammar-Cognition Interface (2019)
 Function and Class in Linguistic Description: The Taxonomic Foundations of Grammar (2021)

References 

Brazilian grammarians
1943 births
Living people